Lech-Lecha, Lekh-Lekha, or Lech-L'cha ( leḵ-ləḵā—Hebrew for "go!" or "leave!", literally "go for you"—the fifth and sixth words in the parashah) is the third weekly Torah portion (parashah) in the annual Jewish cycle of Torah reading. It constitutes . 
The parashah tells the stories of God's calling of Abram (who would become Abraham), Abram's passing off his wife Sarai as his sister, Abram's dividing the land with his nephew Lot, the war between the four kings and the five, the covenant between the pieces, Sarai's tensions with her maid Hagar and Hagar's son Ishmael, and the covenant of circumcision (brit milah).

The parashah is made up of 6,336 Hebrew letters, 1,686 Hebrew words, 126 verses, and 208 lines in a Torah Scroll (Sefer Torah). Jews read it on the third Sabbath after Simchat Torah, in October or November.

Readings
In the Masoretic Text of the Tanakh (Hebrew Bible), Parashah Lech-Lecha has three "open portion" (petuchah) divisions (roughly equivalent to paragraphs, often abbreviated with the Hebrew letter  (peh)). Parashah Lech-Lecha has several further subdivisions, called "closed portion" (setumah) divisions (abbreviated with the Hebrew letter  (samekh)) within the open portion divisions. The first open portion divides the first reading. The second open portion covers the balance of the first and all of the second and third readings. The third open portion spans the remaining readings. Closed portion divisions further divide the fifth and sixth readings.

First reading—Genesis 12:1–13
In the first reading, God told Abram to leave his native land and his father's house for a land that God would show him, promising to make of him a great nation, bless him, make his name great, bless those who blessed him, and curse those who cursed him. Following God's command, at age 75, Abram took his wife Sarai, his nephew Lot, and the wealth and persons that they had acquired in Haran, and traveled to the terebinth of Moreh, at Shechem in Canaan. God appeared to Abram to tell him that God would assign the land to his heirs, and Abram built an altar to God. Abram then moved to the hill country east of Bethel and built an altar to God there and invoked God by name. Then Abram journeyed toward the Negeb. The first open portion ends here.

In the continuation of the reading, famine struck the land, so Abram went down to Egypt, asking Sarai to say that she was his sister so that the Egyptians would not kill him. The first reading ends here.

Second reading—Genesis 12:14–13:4
In the second reading, when Abram and Sarai entered Egypt, Pharaoh's courtiers praised Sarai's beauty to Pharaoh, and she was taken into Pharaoh's palace. Pharaoh took Sarai as his wife. Because of her, Abram acquired sheep, oxen, donkeys, slaves, and camels, but God afflicted Pharaoh and his household with mighty plagues. Pharaoh questioned Abram why he had not told Pharaoh that Sarai was Abram's wife. Pharaoh returned Sarai to Abram and had his men take them away with their possessions. Abram, Sarai, and Lot returned to the altar near Bethel. The second reading ends here.

Third reading—Genesis 13:5–18
In the third reading, Abram and Lot now had so many sheep and cattle that the land could not support them both, and their herdsmen quarreled. Abram proposed to Lot that they separate, inviting Lot to choose which land he would take. Lot saw how well watered the plain of the Jordan was, so he chose it for himself, and journeyed eastward, settling near Sodom, a city of wicked sinners, while Abram remained in Canaan. God promised to give all the land that Abram could see to him and his offspring forever, and to make his offspring as numerous as the dust of the earth. Abram moved to the terebinths of Mamre in Hebron, and built an altar there to God. The third reading and the second open portion end here with the end of chapter .

Fourth reading—Genesis 14:1–20
In the fourth reading, in chapter , the Mesopotamian Kings Amraphel of Shinar, Arioch of Ellasar, Chedorlaomer of Elam, and Tidal of Goiim made war on the Canaanite kings of Sodom, Gomorrah, Admah, Zeboiim, and Zoar, who joined forces at the Battle of Siddim, now the Dead Sea. The Canaanite kings had served Chedorlaomer for twelve years, but rebelled in the thirteenth year. In the fourteenth year, Chedorlaomer and the Mesopotamian kings with him went on a military campaign and defeated several peoples in and around Canaan: the Rephaim, the Zuzim, the Emim, the Horites, the Amalekites, and the Amorites. Then the kings of Sodom, Gomorrah, Admah, Zeboiim, and Zoar engaged the four Mesopotamian kings in battle in the Valley of Siddim. The Mesopotamians routed the Canaanites, and the kings of Sodom and Gomorrah fled into bitumen pits in the valley, while the rest escaped to the hill country. The Mesopotamians seized all the wealth of Sodom and Gomorrah, as well as Lot and his possessions, and departed. A fugitive brought the news to Abram, who mustered his 318 retainers, and pursued the invaders north to Dan. Abram and his servants defeated them at night, chased them north of Damascus, and brought back all the people and possessions, including Lot and his possessions. When Abram returned, the king of Sodom came out to meet him in the Valley of Shaveh, the Valley of the King. King Melchizedek of Salem (Jerusalem), a priest of God Most High, brought out bread and wine and blessed Abram and God Most High, and he gave him a tenth of everything. The fourth reading ends here.

Fifth reading—Genesis 14:21–15:6
In the fifth reading, the king of Sodom offered Abram to keep all the possessions if he would merely return the people, but Abram swore to God Most High not to take so much as a thread or a sandal strap from Sodom, but would take only shares for the men who went with him. A closed portion ends here with the end of chapter .

As the reading continues in chapter , some time later, the word of God appeared to Abram, saying not to fear, for his reward would be very great, but Abram questioned what God could give him, as he was destined to die childless, and his steward Eliezer of Damascus would be his heir. The word of God replied that Eliezer would not be his heir, Abram's own son would. God took Abram outside and bade him to count the stars, for so numerous would his offspring be, and because Abram put his trust in God, God reckoned it to his merit. The fifth reading ends here.

Sixth reading—Genesis 15:7–17:6
In the sixth reading, God directed Abram to bring three heifers, three goats, three rams, a turtledove, and a bird, to cut the non-birds in two, and to place each half opposite the other. Abram drove away birds of prey that came down upon the carcasses, and as the sun was about to set, he fell into a deep sleep. God told Abram that his offspring would be strangers in a land not theirs, and be enslaved 400 years, but God would execute judgment on the nation they were to serve, and in the end they would go free with great wealth and return in the fourth generation, after the iniquity of the Amorites was complete. And there appeared a smoking oven, and a flaming torch, which passed between the pieces. And God made a covenant with Abram to assign to his offspring the land from the river of Egypt to the Euphrates: the land of the Kenites, the Kenizzites, the Kadmonites, the Hittites, the Perizzites, the Rephaim, the Amorites, the Canaanites, the Girgashites, and the Jebusites. A closed portion ends here with the end of chapter .

As the reading continues in chapter , having borne no children after 10 years in Canaan, Sarai bade Abram to consort with her Egyptian maidservant Hagar, so that Sarai might have a son through her, and Abram did as Sarai requested. When Hagar saw that she had conceived, Sarai was lowered in her esteem, and Sarai complained to Abram. Abram told Sarai that her maid was in her hands, and Sarai treated her harshly, so Hagar ran away. An angel of God found Hagar by a spring of water in the wilderness, and asked her where she came from and where she was going, and she replied that she was running away from her mistress. The angel told her to go back to her mistress and submit to her harsh treatment, for God would make Hagar's offspring too numerous to count; she would bear a son whom she should name Ishmael, for God had paid heed to her suffering. Ishmael would be a wild donkey of a man, with his hand against everyone, and everyone's hand against him, but he would dwell alongside his kinsmen. Hagar called God "El-roi," meaning that she had gone on seeing after God saw her, and the well was called Beer-lahai-roi. And when Abram was 86 years old, Hagar bore him a son, and Abram gave him the name Ishmael. A closed portion ends here with the end of chapter .

As the reading continues in chapter , when Abram was 99 years old, God appeared to Abram as El Shaddai and asked him to walk in God's ways and be blameless, for God would establish a covenant with him and make him exceedingly numerous. Abram threw himself on his face, and God changed his name from Abram to Abraham, promising to make him the father of a multitude of nations and kings. The sixth reading ends here.

Seventh reading—Genesis 17:7–27
In the seventh reading, God promised to maintain the covenant with Abraham and his offspring as an everlasting covenant throughout the ages, and assigned all the land of Canaan to him and his offspring as an everlasting holding. God further told Abraham that he and his offspring throughout the ages were to keep God's covenant and every male (including every slave) was to be circumcised in the flesh of his foreskin at the age of eight days as a sign of the covenant with God. If any male failed to circumcise the flesh of his foreskin, that person was to be cut off from his kin for having broken God's covenant. And God renamed Sarai as Sarah, and told Abraham that God would bless her and give Abraham a son by her so that she would give rise to nations and rulers. Abraham threw himself on his face and laughed at the thought that a child could be born to a man of a hundred and a woman of ninety, and Abraham asked God to bless Ishmael. But God told him that Sarah would bear Abraham a son, and Abraham was to name him Isaac, and God would maintain the everlasting covenant with him and his offspring. In response to Abraham's prayer, God blessed Ishmael as well and promised to make him exceedingly numerous, the father of twelve chieftains and a great nation. But God would maintain the covenant with Isaac, whom Sarah would bear at the same season the next year. And when God finished speaking, God disappeared. That very day, Abraham circumcised himself, Ishmael, and every male in his household, as God had directed. The maftir reading that concludes the parashah reports that when Abraham circumcised himself and his household, Abraham was 99 and Ishmael was 13. The seventh reading, the third open portion, chapter , and the parashah end here.

Readings according to the triennial cycle
Jews who read the Torah according to the triennial cycle of Torah reading read the parashah according to the following schedule:

In ancient parallels
The parashah has parallels in these ancient sources:

Genesis chapter 14

In inner-biblical interpretation
The parashah has parallels or is discussed in these Biblical sources:

Genesis chapter 12
 reports that Abram's father Terah lived beyond the River Euphrates and served other gods.

While  reports that Terah took Abram, Lot, and Sarai from Ur of the Chaldees to Haran, and  subsequently reports God's call to Abram to leave his country and his father's house,  reports that God chose Abram and brought him out of Ur of the Chaldees.

Genesis chapter 15
In , God promised that Abraham's descendants would be as numerous as the stars of heaven. In , God reminded Isaac that God had promised Abraham that God would make his heirs as numerous as the stars. In , Jacob reminded God that God had promised that Jacob's descendants would be as numerous as the sands. In , Moses reminded God that God had promised to make the Patriarch's descendants as numerous as the stars. In , Moses reported that God had multiplied the Israelites until they were then as numerous as the stars. In , Moses reported that God had made the Israelites as numerous as the stars. And  foretold that the Israelites would be reduced in number after having been as numerous as the stars. But  tells that God "counts the number of the stars," and  reports that God "brings out their host by number" and "calls them all by name."

Genesis chapter 17
In , God told Abraham, "Walk in My ways and be blameless."

In early nonrabbinic interpretation
The parashah has parallels or is discussed in these early nonrabbinic sources:

Genesis chapter 12
The second century BCE Book of Jubilees reported that Abraham endured ten trials and was found faithful and patient in spirit. Jubilees listed eight of the trials: (1) leaving his country, (2) the famine, (3) the wealth of kings, (4) his wife taken from him, (5) circumcision, (6) Hagar and Ishmael driven away, (7) the binding of Isaac, and (8) buying the land to bury Sarah.

Philo interpreted Abram's migration allegorically as the story of a soul devoted to virtue and searching for God.

The Apocalypse of Abraham told that Abraham argued to his father Terah that fire is more worthy of honor than idols, because its flames mock perishable things. Even more worthy of honor was water, because it conquers the fire and satisfies the earth. He called the earth more worthy of honor, because it overpowers the nature of the water. He called the sun more worthy of honor, because its rays illumine the whole world. But even the sun Abraham did not call god, because at night and by clouds it is obscured. Nor did Abraham call the moon or the stars god, because they also in their season obscure their light. Abraham argued to his father that they should worship the God who made everything, including the heavens, the sun, the moon, the stars, and the earth. And while Abraham thus spoke to his father in the court of his house, the voice of God came down from heaven in a fiery cloudburst, crying to Abraham to leave his father's house so that he would not also die in his father's sins.

In classical rabbinic interpretation
The parashah is discussed in these rabbinic sources from the era of the Mishnah and the Talmud:

Genesis chapter 12
The Mishnah taught that Abraham suffered ten trials and withstood them all, demonstrating how great Abraham's love was for God. The Avot of Rabbi Natan taught  that two trials were when God asked him to leave Haran, two were with his two sons, two were with his two wives, one was in the wars of the Kings, one was at the covenant between the pieces, one was in Ur of the Chaldees (where, according to a tradition, he was thrown into a furnace and came out unharmed), and one was the covenant of circumcision. The Pirke De-Rabbi Eliezer counted as the ten trials: (1) when Abram was a child and all the magnates of the kingdom and the magicians sought to kill him (see below), (2) when he was put into prison for ten years and cast into the furnace of fire, (3) his migration from his father's house and from the land of his birth, (4) the famine, (5) when Sarah his wife was taken to be Pharaoh's wife, (6) when the kings came to kill him, (7) when (in the words of ) "the word of the Lord came to Abram in a vision," (8) when Abram was 99 years old and God asked him to circumcise himself, (9) when Sarah asked Abraham (in the words of ) to "Cast out this bondwoman and her son," and (10) the binding of Isaac.

The Pirke De-Rabbi Eliezer told that the first trial was when Abram was born, and all the magnates of the kingdom and the magicians sought to kill him. Abram's family hid Abram in a cave for 13 years, during which he never saw the sun or moon. After 13 years, Abram came out speaking the holy language, Hebrew, and he despised idols and trusted in God, saying (in the words of ): "Blessed is the man who trusts in You." In the second trial, Abram was put in prison for ten years—three years in Kuthi and seven years in Budri. After 10 years, they brought him out and cast him into the furnace of fire, and God delivered him from the furnace, as  says, "And He said to him, 'I am the Lord who brought you out of the furnace of the Chaldees." Similarly,  reports, "You are the Lord the God, who did choose Abram, and brought him forth out of the furnace of the Chaldees." The third trial was Abram's migration from his father's house and from the land of his birth. God brought him to Haran, and there his father Terah and Athrai his mother died. The Pirke De-Rabbi Eliezer taught that migration is harder for a human than for any other creature. And  tells of his migration when it says, "Now the Lord said to Abram, 'Get out.'"

Rabbi Hiyya said that Abram's father Terah manufactured idols (as  implies), and once Terah went away and left Abram to mind the store. A man came and asked to buy an idol. Abram asked the man how old he was. The man replied that he was 50 years old. Abram exclaimed that it was a shame that a man of 50 would worship a day-old object. The man became embarrassed and left. On another occasion, a woman came with a plate of flour and asked Abram to offer it to the idols. Abram took a stick, broke the idols, and put the stick in the largest idol's hand. When Terah returned, he demanded that Abram explain what he had done. Abram told Terah that the idols fought among themselves to be fed first, and the largest broke the others with the stick. Terah asked Abram why he mocked him, for the idols had no consciousness. Abram replied by asking Terah to listen to what he had just said. Thereupon Terah seized Abram and delivered him to Nimrod, king of Shinar. Nimrod proposed that they worship the fire. Abram replied that they should rather worship water, which extinguishes fire. Nimrod agreed to worship water. Abram replied that they should rather worship clouds, which bear the water. Nimrod agreed to worship the clouds. Abram replied that they should rather worship the winds, which disperse the clouds. Nimrod agreed to worship the wind. Abram replied that they should rather worship human beings, who withstand the wind. Nimrod then accused Abram of just bandying words and decreed that they would worship nothing but fire. Nimrod cast Abram into the fire, challenging Abram's God to save him from it. Haran was standing there undecided. Haran thought to himself that if Abram survived, then Haran would say that he was of Abram's faith, but if Nimrod was victorious, then Haran would say that he was on Nimrod's side. When Abram descended into the fiery furnace, God saved him. Nimrod then asked Haran whose belief he shared, and Haran replied that he shared Abram's faith. Thereupon Nimrod cast Haran into the fire, and he died in his father's presence, as  reports, "And Haran died in the presence of his father Terah."

Rabbi Aha said in the name of Rabbi Samuel ben Nahman (or others say Rabbi Alexandri's name) in Rabbi Nathan's name that Abraham knew and observed even the laws of the courtyard eruv. Rabbi Phinehas (and others say Rabbi Helkiah and Rabbi Simon) said in the name of Rabbi Samuel that Abraham knew even the new name that God will one day give to Jerusalem, as  says, "At that time they shall call Jerusalem 'The Throne of God.'" Rabbi Berekiah, Rabbi Hiyya, and the Rabbis of Babylonia taught in Rabbi Judah's name that a day does not pass in which God does not teach a new law in the heavenly Court. For as  says, "Hear attentively the noise of His voice, and the meditation that goes out of His mouth." And meditation refers to nothing but Torah, as  says, "You shall meditate therein day and night." And Abraham knew them all.

Rabbi Isaac compared Abram's thinking to that of a man who was travelling from place to place when he saw a building in flames. He wondered whether it was possible that the building could lack a person to look after it. At that moment, the owner of the building appeared and said that he owned the building. Similarly, Abram questioned whether it was conceivable that the world could exist without a Guide to look after it. At that moment, God told Abram that God is the Guide, the Sovereign of the Universe.

Thus, the Midrash said that Ecclesiastes , "Wisdom makes a wise man stronger than ten rulers," refers to Abraham, whom wisdom made stronger than the ten generations from Noah to Abraham. For out of all of them, God spoke to Abraham alone.

The Gemara reported that some deduced from  that change of place can cancel a person's doom, but another argued that it was the merit of the land of Israel that availed Abraham.

As soon as the vial was taken up, however, its fragrance disseminated. Similarly, God commanded Abraham to travel from place to place, so that his name would become great in the world.

Rabbi Eliezer taught that the five Hebrew letters of the Torah that alone among Hebrew letters have two separate shapes (depending whether they are in the middle or the end of a word)— (Kh, M, N, P, Z)—all relate to the mystery of redemption. With the letter tsade, God will redeem Israel from the oppression of the kingdoms, and God will say to Israel, I have caused a branch to spring forth for you, as  says, "Behold, the man whose name is the Branch (zemach); and he shall grow up (yizmach) out of his place, and he shall build the temple of the Lord." These letters were delivered to Abraham. Jacob's son Asher delivered the mystery of the Redemption to his daughter Serah. When Moses and Aaron came to the elders of Israel and performed signs in their sight, the elders told Serah. She told them that there is no reality in signs. The elders told her that Moses said, "God will surely visit (pakod yifkod) you" (as in ). Serah told the elders that Moses was the one who would redeem Israel from Egypt, for she heard (in the words of ), "I have surely visited (pakod pakadeti) you." The people immediately believed in God and Moses, as  says, "And the people believed, and when they heard that the Lord had visited the children of Israel."

Rabbi Berekiah explained that God was thereby conveying to Abraham that up until that point, God had to bless God's world, but thereafter, God entrusted the ability to bless to Abraham, and Abraham could thenceforth bless whomever he wanted to bless.

But Rabbi Judah and the Rabbis disagreed.

"And I will make of you a great nation" is fulfilled in the opening of the first blessing of the Amidah prayer when Jews say, "God of Abraham." "And I will bless you" is fulfilled when Jews say, "God of Isaac," as it is a blessing for a father when the name of his son is eternalized. "And I will make your name great" is fulfilled when they say, "God of Jacob." One might have thought that Jews should conclude the first blessing of the Amidah prayer with the names of all the Patriarchs, so  says, "And you will be a blessing," which implies that since  concludes with Abraham, Jews conclude the blessing with Abraham, and not with all of the Patriarchs, and this is why the first blessing of the Amidah prayer ends, "Shield of Abraham."

Rav Judah deduced from  that to refuse to say grace when given a cup to bless will shorten a person's life. And Rabbi Joshua ben Levi deduced from  that every kohen who pronounces the benediction is himself blessed.

Resh Lakish deduced from  that the Torah regards people who teach Torah to their neighbor's children as though they had fashioned them.

Similarly, Rabbi Leazar in the name of Rabbi Jose ben Zimra observed that if all the nations assembled to create one insect, they could not bring it to life, yet  says, "the souls whom they had made in Haran." Rabbi Leazar in the name of Rabbi Jose ben Zimra interpreted the words "the souls whom they had made" to refer to the proselytes whom Abram and Sarai had converted. The Midrash asked why then  did not simply say, "whom they had converted," and instead says, "whom they had made." The Midrash answered that  thus teaches that one who brings a nonbeliever near to God is like one who created a life. Noting that  does not say, "whom he had made," but instead says "whom they had made," Rabbi Hunia taught that Abraham converted the men, and Sarah converted the women.

Rabbi Haggai said in Rabbi Isaac's name that all of the Matriarchs were prophets.

The Tanna debe Eliyyahu taught that the world is destined to exist for 6,000 years. The first 2,000 years were to be void, the next 2,000 years were the period of the Torah, and the last 2,000 years are the period of the Messiah. And the Gemara taught that the 2,000 years of the Torah began when, as  reports, Abraham and Sarah had gotten souls in Haran, when by tradition Abraham was 52 years old.

Rabbi Elazar said that one should always anticipate misfortune with prayer; for it was only by virtue of Abram's prayer between Bethel and Ai reported in  that Israel's troops survived at the Battle of Ai in Joshua's days.

The Rabbis deduced from  that when there is a famine in one's land, one should emigrate.

Rabbi Phinehas said in Rabbi Hoshaya's name that God told Abraham to go forth and set a path for his children, for everything written in connection with Abraham is written in connection with his children:

Similarly, Rabbi Joshua of Sikhnin taught that God gave Abraham a sign: Everything that happened to him would also happen to his children:

Rav deduced from  that Abram had not even looked at his own wife before that point.

The Midrash taught that Abram had put Sarai in a box and locked her in. The Midrash told that when Abram came to the Egyptian customs house, the customs officer demanded that Abram pay the custom duty on the box and its contents, and Abram agreed to pay. The customs officer proposed that Abram must have been carrying garments in the box, and Abram agreed to pay the duty for garments. The customs officer then proposed that Abram must have been carrying silks in the box, and Abram agreed to pay the duty for silks. The customs officer then proposed that Abram must have been carrying precious stones in the box, and Abram agreed to pay the duty for precious stones. But then the customs officer insisted that Abram open the box so that the customs officers could see what it contained. As soon as Abram opened the box, Sarai's beauty illuminated the land of Egypt.

And  says, "the Egyptians beheld the woman that she was very fair"—, me'od—which the Midrash interpreted to mean that Sarai was even more beautiful than Eve. One prince said that he would give a hundred dinars for the right to enter the palace with Sarai, whereupon another bid two hundred dinars.

Rabbi Helbo deduced from  that a man must always observe the honor due to his wife, because blessings rest on a man's home only on account of her.

Rabbi Samuel bar Nahmani said in the name of Rabbi Johanan that leprosy resulted from seven things: slander, bloodshed, vain oath, incest, arrogance, robbery, and envy.

Genesis chapter 13
A Baraita deduced from the words, "like the garden of the Lord, like the land of Egypt," in  that among all the nations, there was none more fertile than Egypt. And the Baraita taught that there was no more fertile spot in Egypt than Zoan, where kings lived, for  says of Pharaoh, "his princes are at Zoan." The Baraita rejected the plain meaning of "built," reasoning that Ham would not build a house for his younger son Canaan (in whose land was Hebron) before he built one for his elder son Mizraim (in whose land was Zoan), and  lists (presumably in order of birth) "the sons of Ham: Cush, and Mizraim, and Put, and Canaan."

Rabbi Issi taught that there was no city in the plain better than Sodom, for Lot had searched through all the cities of the plain and found none like Sodom. Thus the people of Sodom were the best of all, yet as  reports, "the men of Sodom were wicked and sinners." They were "wicked" to each other, "sinners" in adultery, "against the Lord" in idolatry, and "exceedingly" engaged in bloodshed.

The Mishnah deduced from  that the men of Sodom would have no place in the world to come.

Genesis chapter 14
So Rav Ashi replied that wa-yehi sometimes presages misfortune, and sometimes it does not, but the expression "and it came to pass in the days of" always presages misfortune.

One held that his name was actually Nimrod, and  calls him Amraphel because he ordered Abram to be cast into a burning furnace (and thus the name Amraphel reflects the words for "he said" (amar) and "he cast" (hipil)). But the other held that his name was actually Amraphel, and  calls him Nimrod because he led the world in rebellion against God (and thus the name Nimrod reflects the word for "he led in rebellion" (himrid)).<ref>Babylonian Talmud Eruvin 53a, in, e.g., Koren Talmud Bavli: Eiruvin · Part Two. Commentary by Adin Even-Israel (Steinsaltz), volume 5, page 8. Jerusalem: Koren Publishers, 2013.</ref>

They told Abraham that he was king over them and a god to them. But Abraham replied that the world did not lack its King, and the world did not lack its God.

A Midrash taught that there was not a mighty man in the world more difficult to overcome than Og, as  says, "only Og king of Bashan remained of the remnant of the Rephaim." The Midrash taught that Og was the refuse among the Rephaim, like a hard olive that escapes being mashed in the olive press. The Midrash taught that Og intended that Abram should go out and be killed. God rewarded Og for delivering the message by allowing him to live all the years from Abraham to Moses, but God collected Og's debt to God for his evil intention toward Abraham by causing Og to fall by the hand of Abraham's descendants. On coming to make war with Og, Moses was afraid, thinking that he was only 120 years old, while Og was more than 500 years old, and if Og had not possessed some merit, he would not have lived all those years. So God told Moses (in the words of ), "fear him not; for I have delivered him into your hand," implying that Moses should slay Og with his own hand.

Rabbi Abbahu said in Rabbi Eleazar's name that "his trained men" in  meant Torah scholars, and thus when Abram made them fight to rescue Lot, he brought punishment on himself and his children, who were consequently enslaved in Egyptian for 210 years. But Samuel said that Abram was punished because he questioned whether God would keep God's promise, when in  Abram asked God "how shall I know that I shall inherit it?" And Rabbi Johanan said that Abram was punished because he prevented people from entering beneath the wings of the Shekhinah and being saved, when in  the king of Sodom said it to Abram, "Give me the persons, and take the goods yourself," and Abram consented to leave the prisoners with the king of Sodom.

Reading the report in  that Abram led 318 men, Rabbi Ammi bar Abba said that Abram's servant Eliezer outweighed them all. The Gemara reported that others (employing gematria) said that Eliezer alone accompanied Abram to rescue Lot, as the Hebrew letters in Eliezer's name have a numerical value of 318.

The Rabbis taught that Melchizedek acted as a priest and handed down Adam's robes to Abraham. Rabbi Zechariah said on Rabbi Ishmael's authority (or others say, it was taught at the school of Rabbi Ishmael) that God intended to continue the priesthood from Shem's descendants, as  says, "And he (Melchizedek/Shem) was the priest of the most high God." But then Melchizedek gave precedence in his blessing to Abram over God, and thus God decided to bring forth the priesthood from Abram. As  reports, "And he (Melchizedek/Shem) blessed him (Abram), and said: 'Blessed be Abram of God Most High, Maker of heaven and earth; and blessed be God the Most High, who has delivered your enemies into your hand.'" Abram replied to Melchizedek/Shem by questioning whether the blessing of a servant should be given precedence over that of the master. Hence  says, "And he (Melchizedek/Shem) was the priest of the most high God," implying that Melchizedek/Shem was a priest, but not his descendants.

Rabbi Isaac the Babylonian said that Melchizedek was born circumcised. A Midrash taught that Melchizedek called Jerusalem "Salem." The Rabbis said that Melchizedek instructed Abraham in the Torah. Rabbi Eleazar said that Melchizedek's school was one of three places where the Holy Spirit manifested itself.

Rabbi Judah said in Rabbi Nehorai's name that Melchizedek's blessing yielded prosperity for Abraham, Isaac, and Jacob. Ephraim Miksha'ah the disciple of Rabbi Meir said in the latter's name that Tamar descended from Melchizedek.

Genesis chapter 15
According to the Pirke De-Rabbi Eliezer,  reports Abraham's seventh trial. The Pirke De-Rabbi Eliezer taught that God was revealed to all the prophets in a vision, but to Abraham God was revealed in a revelation and a vision.  tells of the revelation when it says, “And the Lord appeared to him by the oaks of Mamre.” And  tells of the vision when it says, “After these things the word of the Lord came to Abram in a vision.” According to the Pirke De-Rabbi Eliezer, God told Abraham not to fear, for God would shield Abraham against misfortunes everywhere that he would go, and would give him and his children a good reward, in this world and in the world to come, as  says, “Your exceeding great reward.”

The Pirke De-Rabbi Eliezer told that when Abraham left Ur of the Chaldees, all the magnates of the kingdom gave him gifts, and Nimrod gave Abraham Nimrod's first-born son Eliezer as a perpetual slave. After Eliezer had dealt kindly with Isaac by securing Rebekah to be Isaac's wife, he set Eliezer free, and God gave Eliezer his reward in this world by raising him up to become a king—Og, king of Bashan.

The Gemara taught that Abram had told God that Abram had employed astrology to see his destiny and had seen that he was not fated to have children. God replied that Abram should go "outside" of his astrological thinking, for the stars do not determine Israel's fate.

The Pesikta de-Rav Kahana taught that Sarah was one of seven barren women about whom  says (speaking of God), "He ... makes the barren woman to dwell in her house as a joyful mother of children." The Pesikta de-Rav Kahana also listed Rebekah, Rachel, Leah, Manoah's wife, Hannah, and Zion.

The Mekhilta of Rabbi Ishmael taught that Abraham inherited both this world and the World to Come as a reward for his faith, as  says, "And he believed in the Lord."

Resh Lakish taught that Providence punishes bodily those who unjustifiably suspect the innocent. In , Moses said that the Israelites "will not believe me," but God knew that the Israelites would believe. God thus told Moses that the Israelites were believers and descendants of believers, while Moses would ultimately disbelieve. The Gemara explained that  reports that "the people believed" and  reports that the Israelites' ancestor Abram "believed in the Lord," while  reports that Moses "did not believe." Thus, Moses was smitten when in  God turned his hand white as snow.

Rabbi Jacob bar Aha said in the name of Rav Assi that Abraham asked God whether God would wipe out Abraham's descendants as God had destroyed the generation of the Flood. Abraham asked God if Abraham's descendants should sin before God, would God do to them as God did to the generation of the Flood (in ) and the generation of the Dispersion (in Genesis in ). God told Abraham that God would not. Abraham then asked God (as reported in ), "Let me know how I shall inherit it." God answered by instructing Abraham (as reported in ), "Take Me a heifer of three years old, and a she-goat of three years old" (which Abraham was to sacrifice to God). Abraham acknowledged to God that this means of atonement through sacrifice would hold good while a sacrificial shrine remained in being, but Abraham pressed God what would become of his descendants when the Temple would no longer exist. God replied that God had already long ago provided for Abraham's descendants in the Torah the order of the sacrifices, and whenever they read it, God would deem it as if they had offered them before God, and God would grant them pardon for all their iniquities. Rabbi Jacob bar Aha said in the name of Rav Assi that this demonstrated that were it not for the Ma'amadot, groups of lay Israelites who participated in worship as representatives of the public, then heaven and earth could not endure.

Reading , “And he said: ‘O Lord God, whereby shall I know that I shall inherit it?’” Rabbi Hama bar Hanina taught that Abraham was not complaining, but asked God through what merit Abraham would inherit the land. God replied that Abraham and his descendants would merit the land through the atoning sacrifices that God would institute for Abraham's descendants, as indicated by the next verse, in which God said, “Take Me a heifer of three years old . . . .”

Reading , “And He said to him: ‘Take me a heifer of three years old (meshuleshet), a she-goat of three years old (meshuleshet), and a ram of three years old (meshulash),’” a Midrash read , meshuleshet, to mean “three-fold” or “three kinds,” indicating sacrifices for three different purposes. The Midrash deduced that God thus showed Abraham three kinds of bullocks, three kinds of goats, and three kinds of rams that Abraham's descendants would need to sacrifice. The three kinds of bullocks were: (1) the bullock that  would require the Israelites to sacrifice on the Day of Atonement (Yom Kippur), (2) the bullock that  would require the Israelites to bring on account of unwitting transgression of the law, and (3) the heifer whose neck  would require the Israelites to break. The three kinds of goats were: (1) the goats that  would require the Israelites to sacrifice on festivals, (2) the goats that  would require the Israelites to sacrifice on the New Moon (Rosh Chodesh), and (3) the goat that  would require an individual to bring. The three kinds of rams were: (1) the guilt-offering of certain obligation that , for example, would require one who committed a trespass to bring, (2) the guilt-offering of doubt to which one would be liable when in doubt whether one had committed a transgression, and (3) the lamb to be brought by an individual. The Rabbis said that God showed Abraham the tenth of an ephah as well, for  says “all these (eleh),” just as  says, “And you shall bring the meal-offering that is made of these things (me-eleh),” and the use of “these” in both verses hints that both verses refer to the same thing. And reading , “But the bird divided he not,” the Midrash deduced that God intimated to Abraham that the bird burnt-offering would be divided, but the bird sin-offering (which the dove and young pigeon symbolized) would not be divided.

The Midrash read  to read, "and they were taken in possession by it." The Midrash thus taught that in the case of Goshen, the land seized the Israelites, so that their bond might be exacted and so as to bring about God's declaration to Abraham in  that the Egyptians would afflict the Israelites for 400 years. But the Midrash read  to teach the Israelites that if they were worthy, the Land of Israel would be an eternal possession, but if not, they would be banished from it.

The Mishnah pointed to God's announcement to Abram in  that his descendants would return from Egyptian slavery to support the proposition that the merits of the father bring about benefits for future generations.

The Midrash noted that at the creation of the world, the Euphrates was not designated "great." But it is called "great" because it encompasses the Land of Israel, which  calls a "great nation." As a popular saying said, the king's servant is a king, and thus Scripture calls the Euphrates great because of its association with the great nation of Israel.

Genesis chapter 16
Rabbi Simeon bar Yohai deduced from the words, "and she had a handmaid, an Egyptian, whose name was Hagar," in  that Hagar was Pharaoh's daughter. Rabbi Simeon taught that when Pharaoh saw what God did on Sarah's behalf, Pharaoh gave his daughter to Sarai, reasoning that it would be better for his daughter to be a handmaid in Sarai's house than a mistress in another house. Rabbi Simeon read the name "Hagar" in to mean "reward" (agar), imagining Pharaoh to say, "Here is your reward (agar)."

The Rabbi of the Midrash reasoned that only that which is demolished must be "built up."

Rabbi Simeon wept that Hagar, the handmaid of Rabbi Simeon's ancestor Abraham's house, was found worthy of meeting an angel on three occasions (including in ), while Rabbi Simeon did not meet an angel even once.

A Midrash found in  support for the proverb that if a person tells you that you have a donkey's ears, do not believe it, but if two tell it to you, order a halter. Similarly, Rava asked Rabbah bar Mari where Scripture supports the saying of the Rabbis that if your neighbor (justifiably) calls you a donkey, you should put a saddle on your back (and not quarrel to convince the neighbor otherwise).

Rabbi Hama bar Rabbi Hanina said that five angels visited her, for each time the text mentions "speech," it refers to an angel. The Rabbis said that four angels visited her, as the word "angel" occurs 4 times. Rabbi Hiyya taught that Hagar's encounter with the angels showed how great the difference was between the generations of the Patriarchs and Matriarchs and later generations. Rabbi Hiyya noted that after  reports that Manoah and his wife, the parents of Samson, saw an angel, Manoah exclaimed to his wife in fear (in ), "We shall surely die, because we have seen God." Yet Hagar, a bondmaid, saw five angels and was not afraid. Rabbi Aha taught that a fingernail of the Patriarchs was more valuable than the abdomen of their descendants. Rabbi Isaac interpreted , "She sees the ways of her household," to apply homiletically to teach that all who lived in Abraham's household were seers, so Hagar was accustomed to seeing angels.

Rabbi Simeon wept when he thought that Hagar, the handmaid of Rabbi Simeon's ancestor Sarah, was found worthy of meeting an angel three times (including in ), while Rabbi Simeon did not meet an angel even once.

A Midrash counted , in which the angel told Hagar, "Behold, you are with child ... and you shall call his name Ishmael," among four instances in which Scripture identifies a person's name before birth. Rabbi Isaac also counted the cases of Isaac (in ), Solomon (in ), and Josiah (in ).

Genesis chapter 17
Resh Lakish taught that the words "I am God Almighty (El Shaddai)" in  mean, "I am He Who said to the world: 'Enough! (Dai).'" Resh Lakish taught that when God created the sea, it went on expanding, until God rebuked it and caused it to dry up, as  says, "He rebukes the sea and makes it dry, and dries up all the rivers."

Rabbi Judah compared it to a king who had two sons, one grown up and the other a child. The king asked the child to walk with him. But the king asked the adult to walk before him. Similarly, to Abraham, whose moral strength was great, God said, "Walk before Me." But of Noah, who was feeble,  says, "Noah walked with God." Rabbi Nehemiah compared Noah to a king's friend who was plunging about in dark alleys, and when the king saw him sinking in the mud, the king urged his friend to walk with him instead of plunging about. Abraham's case, however, was compared to that of a king who was sinking in dark alleys, and when his friend saw him, the friend shined a light for him through the window. The king then asked his friend to come and shine a light before the king on his way. Thus, God told Abraham that instead of showing a light for God from Mesopotamia, he should come and show one before God in the Land of Israel. Similarly,  says, "And he blessed Joseph, and said: The God before whom my fathers Abraham and Isaac did walk . ... " Rabbi Berekiah in Rabbi Johanan's name and Resh Lakish gave two illustrations of this. Rabbi Johanan said: It was as if a shepherd stood and watched his flocks. (Similarly, Abraham and Isaac walked before God and under God's protection.) Resh Lakish said: It was as if a prince walked along while the elders preceded him (as an escort, to make known his coming). (Similarly, Abraham and Isaac walked before God, spreading word of God.) The Midrash taught that in Rabbi Johanan's view: We need God's proximity, while in Resh Lakish's view, God needs us to glorify God (by propagating the knowledge of God's greatness). The Midrash compared this to a king whose son went on a mission for his father. The road ahead of him was sunken in mire, and the king supported him so that he would not sink in the mire. For the Patriarchs would try to anticipate the Divine Presence, and would go ahead to do God's will.

Rabbi Hoshaiah taught that if one perfects oneself, then good fortune will follow, for  says, "Walk before me and be perfect," and shortly thereafter  reports Abram's reward for doing so: "And you shall be a father of many nations."

According to Rabbi Ammi bar Abba, at first God gave Abram mastery over 243 of his body parts, as the numerical value of the Hebrew letters in Abram is 243. Then God gave Abraham mastery over 248 of his body parts, adding five body parts, as the numerical value of the Hebrew letter hei that God added to his name is five. The Gemara explained that as a reward for Abraham's undergoing circumcision, God granted Abraham control over his two eyes, his two ears, and the organ that he circumcised.

Rav Zeira taught that all the nations are uncircumcised in each of the first four ways, and all the house of Israel are uncircumcised in heart, in that their hearts do not allow them to do God's will. And Rav Zeira taught that in the future, God will take away from Israel the uncircumcision of their hearts, and they will not harden their stubborn hearts anymore before their Creator, as  says, "And I will take away the stony heart out of your flesh, and I will give you an heart of flesh," and  says, "And you shall be circumcised in the flesh of your foreskin."

Rabbi Hama son of Rabbi Hanina taught that visiting those who have had medical procedures (as Abraham had in ) demonstrates one of God's attributes that humans should emulate. Rabbi Hama son of Rabbi Hanina asked what  means in the text, "You shall walk after the Lord your God." How can a human being walk after God, when  says, "[T]he Lord your God is a devouring fire"? Rabbi Hama son of Rabbi Hanina explained that the command to walk after God means to walk after the attributes of God. As God clothes the naked—for  says, "And the Lord God made for Adam and for his wife coats of skin, and clothed them"—so should we also clothe the naked. God visited the sick—for  says, "And the Lord appeared to him by the oaks of Mamre" (after Abraham was circumcised in )—so should we also visit the sick. God comforted mourners—for  says, "And it came to pass after the death of Abraham, that God blessed Isaac his son"—so should we also comfort mourners. God buried the dead—for  says, "And He buried him in the valley"—so should we also bury the dead. Similarly, the Sifre on  taught that to walk in God's ways means to be (in the words of ) "merciful and gracious."

In medieval Jewish interpretation
The parashah is discussed in these medieval Jewish sources:

Genesis chapters 11–22
In their commentaries to Mishnah Avot 5:3 (see "In classical rabbinic interpretation" above), Rashi and Maimonides differed on what 10 trials Abraham faced:

Genesis chapter 13
Maimonides wrote that converts may say such declarations in the prescribed order and not change them in the least, and may bless and pray in the same way as every Jew by birth. Maimonides reasoned that Abraham taught the people, brought many under the wings of the Divine Presence, and ordered members of his household after him to keep God's ways forever. Ever since then, Maimonides taught, whoever adopts Judaism is counted among the disciples of Abraham. They are Abraham's household, and Abraham converted them to righteousness. In the same way that Abraham converted his contemporaries, he converts future generations through the testament that he left behind him. Thus Abraham is the father of his posterity who keep his ways and of all proselytes who adopt Judaism. Therefore, Maimonides counseled converts to pray, "God of our fathers," because Abraham is their father. Maimonides concluded that there is no difference between converts and born Jews. Both should say the blessing, "Who has chosen us," "Who has given us," "Who have taken us for Your own," and "Who has separated us"; for God has chosen converts and separated them from the nations and given them the Torah. For the Torah has been given to born Jews and proselytes alike, as  says, "One ordinance shall be both for you of the congregation, and also for the stranger that sojourns with you, an ordinance forever in your generations; as you are, so shall the stranger be before the Lord." Maimonides counseled converts not to consider their origin as inferior. While born Jews descend from Abraham, Isaac, and Jacob, converts derive from God, through whose word the world was created. As Isaiah said in  "One shall say, I am the Lord's, and another shall call himself by the name of Jacob."

Genesis chapter 15
Baḥya ibn Paquda said that as God brought humanity into existence, gives us life, and bestows on us bounties, all people are under a universal obligation of service to God and obedience to the rational laws observed by Adam, Enoch, Noah and his descendants.

Baḥya read , "and he believed God, and it was counted to him as a righteousness," to illustrate how one's trusting that God will reward deeds in this world and the World To Come is an essential part of perfect faith in God and is incumbent on the believer.

According to the Zohar, Rabbi Abba was once going toward Lod when he met Rabbi Zeira, the son of Rav. Quoting , "And he believed in the Lord, and he counted it to him for righteousness," Rabbi Zeira asked whether it means that God counted it to Abraham, or that Abraham counted it to God. Rabbi Zeira reported that he had heard that it means that God counted it to Abraham, but that interpretation did not satisfy him. Rabbi Abba replied that it is indeed not so. Noting that  says, "and he reckoned her" (vayahsh'veha)" and not "and he reckoned to him (vayahshov lo)," Rabbi Abba taught that this means that Abraham counted it to God. For  says, "And he brought him forth abroad," meaning that God told Abraham, in effect, to give up his astrological speculations; that was not the way to acquire knowledge of God's Name. Abram, it was true, would not beget children, but Abraham would beget children.  says, "So (Koh) shall your seed be." The word , Koh, expresses the tenth sacred Crown of the King by which God's Name may be known; it is the Crown through which judgments are set in motion.

Reading , "and a great, dark dread fell over him (Abraham)," Maimonides taught that when prophets prophesied, their limbs trembled, their physical powers became weak, they lost control of their senses, and thus their minds became free to comprehend what they saw.

In modern interpretation
The parashah is discussed in these modern sources:

Genesis chapters 12–36

Yehuda T. Radday analyzed the 20,504 Hebrew words in Genesis and divided them according to whether they occur in the narrator's description, in direct human speech, or in direct Divine speech.

John Van Seters argued that the Abraham cycle was a post-exilic (after the Babylonian captivity) invention of the 5th century c.e. or later.

Umberto Cassuto identified the following chiastic structure in Abraham's 10 trials in 

A: "Go from your country ..."; leave his father; blessings and promises
B: Sarai is in danger from Pharaoh; a sanctuary is founded at Bethel and the name of the Lord is proclaimed
C: Lot goes away
D: Lot is in jeopardy and is saved
E: Threat to the birth of the first-born; birth of Ishmael; covenant to be fulfilled through second son
E1: Covenant of circumcision; birth of Isaac foretold
D1: Lot is in jeopardy and is saved
C1: Sarah is in danger from Abimelech
B1: Hagar and Ishmael go away; a sanctuary is founded at Beersheba and the name of the Lord is proclaimed
A1: Go to the land of Moriah; bid farewell to his son; blessings and promises

James Kugel wrote that over the last 100 years, scholarship has performed something of a zigzag about the historicity of Abraham. In the late 19th century, scholars were often skeptical of the Biblical account and believed that someone (the Jahwist or Elohist) who lived long after the Israelites had settled Canaan made up the Abrahamic stories to justify that settlement, to claim that although Israel's ancestor had arrived from a distant region, God had granted the land to Abraham. Then, early in the 20th century, archaeologists began turning up evidence that seemed to confirm, or at least coincide with, elements of the Genesis narrative, including evidence of Abraham's hometown, Ur; legal practices, customs, and a way of life that suited the Abrahamic narratives; the names of cities like Haran, Nahur, Terah, Peleg, and Serug mentioned in Genesis; the movement of people throughout the area in the late 18th century BCE; and documentation of adoptions of mature adults and wives like Eliezer and Sarah. In more recent times, however, this approach has come to be questioned, as scholars found that many of the stories contain elements (like the Philistines) from long after the time of Abraham; significant differences appear between the ancient texts and the Biblical passages they supposedly explained; and the absence of any reference to Abraham in the writings of Israel's 8th- and 7th-century prophets, who otherwise refer to Sodom and Gomorrah, Jacob and Esau, and the Exodus and Israel's desert wanderings, but do not mention Abraham until the 6th century or later. Seters argued that the Bible says that Abraham migrated from Babylon to Canaan to reflect the Jews' own "migration" from Babylon after having been exiled there in the 6th century. Kugel concluded that most scholars now concede that the Abrahamic stories contain some very ancient material arguably going back to the 10th or 11th century BCE, transmitted orally, and then transformed into the present, prose formulations at a time that remains the subject of debate.

Genesis chapter 12

Reading , Ephraim Speiser argued that it is significant that God promised to make of Abraham a great “nation” (goy), not “people” (am), for a “nation” (goy) requires a territorial base, since the concept is a political one, while a “people” (am) does not.

Spinoza concluded that other nations, like the Jews, thus had their prophets who prophesied to them. And Spinoza concluded that Jews, apart from their social organization and government, possessed no gift of God above other peoples, and that there was no difference between Jews and non-Jews.

Spinoza deduced that the person who wrote , "the Canaanite was then in the land," must have written at a time when the Canaanites had been driven out and no longer possessed the land, and thus after the death of Moses. Spinoza noted that Abraham ibn Ezra alluded to the difficulty by noting that if, as  indicates, Canaan first settled the land, then the Canaanites still possessed those territories during the time of Moses. Spinoza concluded that Moses did not write the Torah, but someone who lived long after him, and that the book that Moses wrote was something different from any now extant.

Rendsburg argued that the message would have been clear to Israelites living in Solomon's time that even though altars stood throughout the countryside, and some may even have been as old as Abraham, the only place where Abraham actually sacrificed was the mount of the Lord—Jerusalem—and that was why only the Jerusalem Temple was approved for sacrifices to God. Rendsburg concluded that royal scribes living in Jerusalem during the reigns of David and Solomon in the tenth century BCE were responsible for Genesis; their ultimate goal was to justify the monarchy in general, and the kingship of David and Solomon in particular; and Genesis thus appears as a piece of political propaganda.

Reading the three instances of the wife-sister motif in (a) ; (b) ; and (c) , Speiser argued that in a work by a single author, these three cases would present serious contradictions: Abraham would have learned nothing from his narrow escape in Egypt, and so tried the same ruse in Gerar; and Abimelech would have been so little sobered by his perilous experience with Abraham and Sarah that he fell into the identical trap with Isaac and Rebekah. Speiser concluded (on independent grounds) that the Jahwist was responsible for incidents (a) and (c), while the Elohist was responsible for incident (b). If the Elohist had been merely an annotator of the Jahwist, however, the Elohist would still have seen the contradictions for Abimelech, a man of whom the Elohist clearly approved. Speiser concluded that the Jahwist and the Elohist therefore must have worked independently.

Genesis chapter 13
Hermann Gunkel deduced that the sentence, "And the Canaanite and the Perizzite dwelt then in the land," in  must have been written at a time when Canaanites and Perizzites had long since passed away, and thus at a time much after that of the Patriarchs.

Genesis chapter 14
Gunkel identified  as the only chapter of Genesis to contain accounts of great political events, rather than the history of a family.

Plaut wrote that the Habiru were a class of people who lived in the Fertile Crescent during the 19th to 14th centuries B.C.E. who may originally have come from Arabia, became prominent in Mesopotamia, and later spread to Egypt. The Habiru followed distinct occupations, particularly mercenaries and administrators. Although at first they were nomads or seminomads, they later settled, but were usually considered foreigners and maintaining their group identity. The term Habiru referred not so much to an ethnic or linguistic group as to a social or political group. Plaut reported that the words Habiru and “Hebrew” (Ivri) appear to share a common linguistic root. Plaut concluded that Israelites in Egypt likely occupied positions similar to, or because of familial ties were identified with, the Habiru. When non-Israelites repeatedly applied the term to the Israelites, the Israelites themselves began to use the name Habiru, which they pronounced Ivri. Plaut considered it possible that for some time the term Ivri was used only when the Israelites spoke of themselves to outsiders and when outsiders referred to them.

Spinoza noted that  reports that Abraham "pursued as far as Dan," using a name that  indicates was not given to the city until after the death of Moses. Spinoza cited this as evidence that Moses did not write the Torah, but someone who lived long after him.

Spinoza read  to relate that Melchizedek was king of Jerusalem and priest of the Most High God, that in the exercise of his priestly functions (like those  describes) he blessed Abraham, and that Abraham gave to this priest of God a tithe of all his spoils. Spinoza deduced from this that before God founded the Israelite nation, God constituted kings and priests in Jerusalem, and ordained for them rites and laws. Spinoza deduced that while Abraham sojourned in the city, he lived scrupulously according to these laws, for Abraham had received no special rites from God; and yet  reports that he observed the worship, precepts, statutes, and laws of God, which Spinoza interpreted to mean the worship, statutes, precepts, and laws of king Melchizedek.

In , which reports that Melchizedek, king of Salem and priest of El-Elyon (often translated “God Most High”), greeted Abraham with bread and wine and then blessed Abraham, Rendsburg saw the author of Genesis demonstrating the significance of Jerusalem. Rendsburg reported that virtually all scholars agree that Salem is short for Jerusalem. Abraham responded by giving Melchizedek a tenth of all he had—a priestly tithe. Rendsburg argued that a royal scribe in David's court included these verses to justify the continuation of the Jerusalemite priest Zadok as priest in Jerusalem after David took the city as his capital. The scribe, Rendsburg posited, was showing that David merely followed the precedent that the glorious ancestor Abraham set by tithing to a Canaanite priest in Jerusalem. Scholars have noticed that the account of David's life refers to two high priests—Abiathar and Zadok. Rendsburg suggested that Zadok was probably the Canaanite high priest of Jerusalem, whom David permitted to continue to serve in that capacity. In that case, Zadok would also have been king of the city-state of Jerusalem. (Phoenician evidence shows that among the Canaanites, a single individual occupied both roles.) Rendsburg reported that the word Araunah was not a personal name but a title meaning “the Lord” (originally in Hurrian but in other Near Eastern languages as well); for example,  calls him “Araunah the king.” More generally, Rendsburg concluded that royal scribes living in Jerusalem during the reigns of David and Solomon in the tenth century BCE were responsible for Genesis; their ultimate goal was to justify the monarchy in general, and the kingship of David and Solomon in particular; and Genesis thus appears as a piece of political propaganda.

Genesis chapter 15
In , God promised that Abraham's descendants would be as numerous as the stars of heaven. In , God promised that Abraham's descendants would be as numerous as the stars of heaven and the sands on the seashore. Carl Sagan reported that there are more stars in the universe than sands on all the beaches on the Earth.

Plaut noted that while some might read the report of  that the time of Israel's servitude would be 400 years to conflict with the report of  that the descent into Egypt would last 430 years, the two accounts were left standing side by side, because ancient readers might have considered both traditions to have come down to them and therefore requiring treatment with reverence.

Moses Mendelssohn read the report of  that "Abraham trusted in the Eternal" along with the report of  that "the Israelites saw and trusted in the Eternal and in Moses, his servant" to demonstrate that the word often translated as "faith" actually means, in most cases, "trust," "confidence," and "firm reliance." Thus Mendelssohn concluded that Scripture does not command faith, but accepts no other commands than those that come by way of conviction. Its propositions are presented to the understanding, submitted for consideration, without being forced upon our belief. Belief and doubt, assent and opposition, in Mendelssohn's view, are not determined by desire, wishes, longings, fear, or hope, but by knowledge of truth and untruth. Hence, Mendelssohn concluded, ancient Judaism has no articles of faith.

Reading , Spinoza wrote that when Abraham heard God's promise, he demanded a sign, not because he did not believe in God, but because he wished to be sure that it was God Whom he heard. Spinoza concluded that prophecy itself did not afford certainty, and the prophets were assured of God's revelation not by the fact of revelation itself, but by some sign. Spinoza saw prophecy as a form of imagination, which did not, on its own, involve any certainty of truth, but required some extrinsic reason to assure its recipients of its objective reality.

Rendsburg argued that the empire of David and Solomon provided the setting for the statement in  that God gave to Abraham and his descendants “this land, from the river of Egypt to the great river, the Euphrates.” Rendsburg reasoned that this passage makes sense only in the period of David and Solomon, as before David and Solomon, it would have been unimaginable for an author to use these boundaries to define the Land of Israel, and after David and Solomon, Israel once more became a small state and those boundaries were an impossibility. Rendsburg cited this as further support for his conclusion that royal scribes living in Jerusalem during the reigns of David and Solomon in the tenth century BCE were responsible for Genesis.

Genesis chapter 16

Genesis chapter 17
Rendsburg argued that the only time that an author would considered this necessary would be in the time of David and Solomon, as before then, there were no kings (except for the transitional Saul), and after then, kingship was a fait accompli. Arguing that the only time that an author would need to justify kingship was when it was the new creation of Israelite political theorists, Rendsburg cited these verses as further evidence that royal scribes living in Jerusalem during the reigns of David and Solomon in the tenth century BCE were responsible for Genesis.

Commandments
According to Maimonides and Sefer ha-Chinuch, there is one positive commandment in the parashah:
The precept of circumcision.

Thus, the Kitzur Shulchan Aruch cites  to support the proposition that a convert may be included in a group of three or more (mezuman) for the purposes of the blessing after meals (Birkat Hamazon) and may say the blessing and the words of the blessing, "for giving our ancestors as a heritage."

In the liturgy

The Haggadah, in the magid section of the Seder, quotes  to demonstrate that God keeps God's promises. Thereafter, the Haggadah reports that Israel "went down to Egypt—forced to do so by the word [of God]," and many commentators think that this statement refers to God's foretelling in  that Abram's descendants would "be a stranger in a land that is not theirs, and shall serve them."

Following the Kabbalat Shabbat service and prior to the Friday evening (Ma'ariv) service, Jews traditionally read rabbinic sources on the observance of the Sabbath, including Mishnah Shabbat 18:3.

The Weekly Maqam
In the Weekly Maqam, Sephardi Jews base the songs of the services on the content of that week's parashah. For Parashah Lech Lecha, Sephardi Jews apply Maqam Saba, the maqam that symbolizes a covenant (berit), as in this parashah, Abraham and his sons undergo circumcisions, a ritual that signifies a covenant between man and God.

Haftarah
A haftarah is a text selected from the books of Nevi'im ("The Prophets") that is read publicly in the synagogue after the reading of the Torah on Sabbath and holiday mornings. The haftarah usually has a thematic link to the Torah reading that precedes it.

The specific text read following Parashah Lech-Lecha varies according to different traditions within Judaism. Examples are:
for Ashkenazi and Sephardi Jews: -
for Karaite Jews: 

Connection to the parashah
Rashi interprets subsequent verses as referring to either the nations' reactions to this battle or the interaction between Abraham and Melchizedek, leading into God's promise to always aid "the seed of Abraham, who loved Me."

See also
Hagar in Islam
Lot in Islam

Notes

Further reading
The parashah has parallels or is discussed in these sources:

Ancient
Vassal treaties of Esarhaddon. Babylonia, 681–669 BCE.
"To go/pass through" in Hans G. Guterbock & Harry A. Hoffner (eds.), The Hittite Dictionary of the Oriental Institute of the University of Chicago, vol. P, 36–37. Chicago: University of Chicago, 1997.

Biblical
;  (numerous as stars); .
 (circumcision).
 (numerous as stars).
.

Early nonrabbinic
The Genesis Apocryphon. Dead Sea scroll 1Q20. Land of Israel, 1st century BCE, in Géza Vermes. The Complete Dead Sea Scrolls in English, pages 480–91. New York: Penguin Books, 2011. (wife-sister, battle of the kings).
The Heavenly Prince Melchizedek. Dead Sea scroll 11Q13. In Géza Vermes. The Complete Dead Sea Scrolls in English, pages 532–34.
Philo. Allegorical Interpretation 2: 15:59; 3: 8:24; 13:39; 25:79; 26:82–27:83; 28:85; 70:197; 78:217; 81:228; 87:244; On the Cherubim 1:2; That the Worse Attacks the Better 44:159; On Giants 14:63; That God Is Unchangeable 1:4; On Drunkenness 7:24; 27:105; On the Confusion of Tongues 8:26; On the Migration of Abraham 1:1; 3:13; 9:43; 16:86; 19:107; 20:109; 27:148; 30:164; 39:216; Who Is the Heir? 1:2; 7:34; 12:58; 13:66; 14:69; 15:76; 16:81; 17:86; 18:90; 21:102; 25:125; 26:129; 43:207; 48:230; 49:237; 51:249; 54:267; 55:272; 56:275, 277; 60:300; 61:307, 312; 62:313; On the Preliminary Studies 1:1; 13:63; 14:71; 17:92; 18:99; 25:139; 27:153; On Flight and Finding 1:1–6; 22:119; 35:196; On the Change of Names 1:1; 3:15, 18, 22; 4:27; 5:39, 42; 6:51–52; 23:130, 136; 27:148; 33:175, 177; 37:201; 44:253; 45:263–46:264; 47:267; 48:270; On Dreams 1:9:47, 41:240; 2:39:255 On the Life of Abraham 17:77; 46:273; The Decalogue 10:37–38; On the Virtues 39:215–16; That Every Good Person Is Free 5:29; Questions and Answers on Genesis 2: 80; 3: 1–62. Alexandria, Egypt, early 1st century CE. In, e.g., The Works of Philo: Complete and Unabridged, New Updated Edition. Translated by Charles Duke Yonge, pages 44, 52, 54, 59, 73, 75–76, 78, 80, 129, 157–58, 209, 216, 236, 253–54, 257, 261, 263, 267, 269, 274, 276, 278, 281–84, 286, 293, 295–97, 299–300, 302–04, 309–10, 312, 316–17, 321, 331, 339, 341–46, 352–53, 356, 358, 363–64, 369, 386, 406, 418, 434, 521, 662, 684, 839, 841–63. Peabody, Massachusetts: Hendrickson Publishers, 1993.
Josephus. The Wars of the Jews, 5:9:4; 7:10:1. Circa 75 CE. In, e.g., The Works of Josephus: Complete and Unabridged, New Updated Edition. Translated by William Whiston, 716. Peabody, Massachusetts: Hendrickson Publishers, 1987.
Apocalypse of Abraham. Circa 70–150 CE. Translated by R. Rubinkiewicz. In The Old Testament Pseudepigrapha: Volume 1: Apocalyptic Literature and Testaments. Edited by James H. Charlesworth, pages 681–705. New York: Anchor Bible, 1983.
Testament of Abraham. Circa 1st or 2nd century CE. Translated by E. P. Sanders. In The Old Testament Pseudepigrapha: Volume 1: Apocalyptic Literature and Testaments. Edited by James H. Charlesworth, pages 871–902. New York: Anchor Bible, 1983.
Qur'an 2:258; 4:163; 6:74–84; 19:41–50. Arabia, 7th century.

Classical rabbinic
Mishnah: Orlah 1:1–3:9; Shabbat 18:3; Nedarim 3:11; Sotah 7:5; Sanhedrin 10:3; Eduyot 2:9; Avot 5:3; 1:1. Land of Israel, circa 200 CE. In, e.g., The Mishnah: A New Translation. Translated by Jacob Neusner, pages 158–66, 201–02, 411–12, 458, 604–05, 645–46, 685, 836. New Haven: Yale University Press, 1988.
Tosefta: Berakhot 1:12–13; Orlah 1:1–8; Shabbat 7:24, 15:9; Yevamot 8:5; Nedarim 2:5; Sotah 5:12; Sanhedrin 13:8; Eduyot 1:14. Land of Israel, circa 300 CE. In, e.g., The Tosefta: Translated from the Hebrew, with a New Introduction. Translated by Jacob Neusner, pages 7, 158–66, 341–43, 381, 415, 712, 789, 853, 1190, 1250. Peabody, Massachusetts: Hendrickson Publishers, 2002.
Jerusalem Talmud: Berakhot 17a–b; Sheviit 43b; Challah 17a; Bikkurim 5b; Shabbat 106b–07a; Taanit 8b; Megillah 15b; Chagigah 2b; Yevamot 36b, 43b; Ketubot 49a; Nedarim 12a–b; Sotah 32b; Kiddushin 11b, 16b, 19b, 23a; Sanhedrin 17b, 68a; Makkot 9a. Tiberias, Land of Israel, circa 400 CE. In, e.g., Talmud Yerushalmi. Edited by Chaim Malinowitz, Yisroel Simcha Schorr, and Mordechai Marcus, volumes 1, 6b, 11–12, 15, 25–27, 29–30, 32–33, 37, 40, 44–45, 49. Brooklyn: Mesorah Publications, 2005–2019. And in, e.g., The Jerusalem Talmud: A Translation and Commentary. Edited by Jacob Neusner and translated by Jacob Neusner, Tzvee Zahavy, B. Barry Levy, and Edward Goldman. Peabody, Massachusetts: Hendrickson Publishers, 2009.
Genesis Rabbah 5:8; 6:9; 11:7; 14:10; 16:3; 17:5; 20:6; 25:3; 30:4, 10; 38:3, 12–14; 39:1–47:10; 48:1–6, 17, 20; 49:2, 4; 51:9; 52:4, 11; 53:4–5, 7, 13; 54:1–2; 55:7; 56:2, 5, 8, 10; 64:4; 67:9; 85:10; 95. Land of Israel, 5th century. In, e.g., Midrash Rabbah: Genesis. Translated by Harry Freedman and Maurice Simon, volume 1, pages 38, 49, 85, 118, 126–27, 136, 164, 207, 234, 238, 303, 310–408, 417–18, 420–23, 449, 453, 457, 463–67, 473, 476–77, 486, 492, 495, 498, 500; volume 2, pages 511–12, 518–19, 522, 525, 534, 540, 545, 555, 561, 572, 574–75, 579, 596, 613, 631, 658, 762, 771, 779, 795–96, 809, 812, 833, 848, 860, 885, 916, 921. London: Soncino Press, 1939.

Babylonian Talmud: Berakhot 7b, 9b, 13a, 49a, 55a, 56b, 64a; Shabbat 89b, 97a, 105a, 108a, 118b, 130a, 132a–b, 133b, 135a–b, 156a; Eruvin 40b, 53a; Pesachim 52a, 69b, 87b, 92a; Sukkah 31a; Beitzah 8b; Rosh Hashanah 16b; Taanit 27b; Megillah 16b, 31b; Moed Katan 13a, 25b, 27b, 29a; Chagigah 12a, 13a; Yevamot 5b, 13b–14a, 42a, 64a, 70b–71a, 72a, 100b; Ketubot 112a; Nedarim 31b–32b; Nazir 23a–b; Sotah 4b, 17a, 32a, 33b, 38b, 46b; Gittin 2a; Kiddushin 29a, 39a, 41b; Bava Kamma 38b, 60b, 88a, 92b–93a; Bava Metzia 59a; Bava Batra 15b–16a, 56a, 100a, 127a, 163a; Sanhedrin 38b, 44a–b, 59b, 92b, 95b–96a, 99a–b, 107b, 109a, 111a; Makkot 8b, 13b, 23b–24a; Avodah Zarah 9a, 26b–27a; Horayot 10b; Menachot 42a; Chullin 49a, 65a, 89a; Arakhin 16a–b; Keritot 2a; Meilah 17b; Niddah 61a. Babylonia, 6th century. In, e.g., Talmud Bavli. Edited by Yisroel Simcha Schorr, Chaim Malinowitz, and Mordechai Marcus, 72 volumes. Brooklyn: Mesorah Pubs., 2006.
Pesikta de-Rav Kahana 5:2:1. 6th–7th century. In, e.g., Pesiqta deRab Kahana: An Analytical Translation and Explanation. Translated by Jacob Neusner, volume 1, page 71. Atlanta: Scholars Press, 1987.

Medieval
Rashi. Commentary. Genesis 12–17. Troyes, France, late 11th century. In, e.g., Rashi. The Torah: With Rashi's Commentary Translated, Annotated, and Elucidated. Translated and annotated by Yisrael Isser Zvi Herczeg, volume 1, pages 115–72. Brooklyn: Mesorah Publications, 1995.
Judah Halevi. Kuzari. 2:14, 16, 34, 44, 80; 3:7; 4:17. Toledo, Spain, 1130–1140. In, e.g., Jehuda Halevi. Kuzari: An Argument for the Faith of Israel. Introduction by Henry Slonimsky, pages 90, 92, 108, 110, 132, 142, 223. New York: Schocken, 1964.
Abraham ibn Ezra. Commentary on the Torah. Mid-12th century. In, e.g., Ibn Ezra's Commentary on the Pentateuch: Genesis (Bereshit). Translated and annotated by H. Norman Strickman and Arthur M. Silver, pages 149–88. New York: Menorah Publishing Company, 1988.

Maimonides. Mishneh Torah: Hilchot Yesodei HaTorah (The Laws that Are the Foundations of the Torah), chapter 2, halachah 7; chapter 7, halachah 2. Egypt, circa 1170–1180. In, e.g., Mishneh Torah: Hilchot Yesodei HaTorah: The Laws [which Are] the Foundations of the Torah. Translated by Eliyahu Touger, volume 1, pages 166–69, 248–49. New York: Moznaim Publishing, 1989.

Maimonides. Mishneh Torah: Hilchot Avodat Kochavim V'Chukkoteihem (The Laws of the Worship of Stars and their Statutes), chapter 1, halachot 2–3. Egypt, circa 1170–1180. In, e.g., Mishneh Torah: Hilchot Avodat Kochavim V'Chukkoteihem: The Laws of the Worship of Stars and their Statutes.Translated by Eliyahu Touger, volume 3, pages 16–31. New York: Moznaim Publishing, 1990. .
Hezekiah ben Manoah. Hizkuni. France, circa 1240. In, e.g., Chizkiyahu ben Manoach. Chizkuni: Torah Commentary. Translated and annotated by Eliyahu Munk, volume 1, pages 103–30. Jerusalem: Ktav Publishers, 2013.
Nachmanides. Commentary on the Torah. Jerusalem, circa 1270. In, e.g., Ramban (Nachmanides): Commentary on the Torah: Genesis. Translated by Charles B. Chavel, volume 1, pages 164–225. New York: Shilo Publishing House, 1971.Midrash ha-Ne'lam (The Midrash of the Concealed). Spain, 13th century. In Zohar Chadash, pages 24a–26b. Salonika, 1597. In, e.g., The Zohar: Pritzker Edition. Translation and commentary by Nathan Wolski, volume 10, pages 275–315. Stanford, California: Stanford University Press, 2016.
Zohar, part 1, pages 76b–96b. Spain, late 13th century. In, e.g., The Zohar. Translated by Harry Sperling, Maurice Simon, and Paul P. Levertoff. 5 volumes. London: Soncino Press, 1934.
Bahya ben Asher. Commentary on the Torah. Spain, early 14th century. In, e.g., Midrash Rabbeinu Bachya: Torah Commentary by Rabbi Bachya ben Asher. Translated and annotated by Eliyahu Munk, volume 1, pages 216–75. Jerusalem: Lambda Publishers, 2003.
Isaac ben Moses Arama. Akedat Yizhak (The Binding of Isaac). Late 15th century. In, e.g., Yitzchak Arama. Akeydat Yitzchak: Commentary of Rabbi Yitzchak Arama on the Torah. Translated and condensed by Eliyahu Munk, volume 1, pages 92–125. New York, Lambda Publishers, 2001.

Modern
Isaac Abravanel. Commentary on the Torah. Italy, between 1492 and 1509. In, e.g., Abarbanel: Selected Commentaries on the Torah: Volume 1: Bereishis/Genesis. Translated and annotated by Israel Lazar, pages 82–103. Brooklyn: CreateSpace, 2015.
Obadiah ben Jacob Sforno. Commentary on the Torah. Venice, 1567. In, e.g., Sforno: Commentary on the Torah. Translation and explanatory notes by Raphael Pelcovitz, pages 62–85. Brooklyn: Mesorah Publications, 1997.

Moshe Alshich. Commentary on the Torah. Safed, circa 1593. In, e.g., Moshe Alshich. Midrash of Rabbi Moshe Alshich on the Torah. Translated and annotated by Eliyahu Munk, volume 1, pages 91–115. New York, Lambda Publishers, 2000.
Menasseh ben Israel. El Conciliador (The Conciliator). Amsterdam, 1632. In The Conciliator of R. Manasseh Ben Israel: A Reconcilement of the Apparent Contradictions in Holy Scripture: To Which Are Added Explanatory Notes, and Biographical Notices of the Quoted Authorities. Translated by Elias Hiam Lindo, pages 48–64. London, 1842. Reprinted by, e.g., Nabu Press, 2010.

Avraham Yehoshua Heschel. Commentaries on the Torah. Cracow, Poland, mid 17th century. Compiled as Chanukat HaTorah. Edited by Chanoch Henoch Erzohn. Piotrkow, Poland, 1900. In Avraham Yehoshua Heschel. Chanukas HaTorah: Mystical Insights of Rav Avraham Yehoshua Heschel on Chumash. Translated by Avraham Peretz Friedman, pages 48–52. Southfield, Michigan: Targum Press/Feldheim Publishers, 2004.
Thomas Hobbes. Leviathan, 2:26; 3:33, 34, 35, 36. England, 1651. Reprint edited by C. B. Macpherson, pages 332, 417, 436, 443–44, 459–60. Harmondsworth, England: Penguin Classics, 1982.
Baruch Spinoza. Theologico-Political Treatise, chapters 2, 3, 8. Amsterdam, 1670. In, e.g., Baruch Spinoza. Theological-Political Treatise. Translated by Samuel Shirley, pages 22, 39–41, 106–08, 232. Indianapolis: Hackett Publishing Company, 2nd edition, 2001.
Moshe Chaim Luzzatto. Mesillat Yesharim, chapter 4. Amsterdam, 1740. In Mesillat Yesharim: The Path of the Just, page 53. Jerusalem: Feldheim, 1966.
Chaim ibn Attar. Ohr ha-Chaim. Venice, 1742. In Chayim ben Attar. Or Hachayim: Commentary on the Torah. Translated by Eliyahu Munk, volume 1, pages 118–56. Brooklyn: Lambda Publishers, 1999.

Moses Mendelssohn. Jerusalem, § 2. Berlin, 1783. In Jerusalem: Or on Religious Power and Judaism. Translated by Allan Arkush; introduction and commentary by Alexander Altmann, page 100. Hanover, New Hampshire: Brandeis University Press, 1983.
Samuel David Luzzatto (Shadal). Commentary on the Torah. Padua, 1871. In, e.g., Samuel David Luzzatto. Torah Commentary. Translated and annotated by Eliyahu Munk, volume 1, pages 137–75. New York: Lambda Publishers, 2012.
W. Henry Green. "The Pentateuchal Question. II. Gen. 12:6–37:1." Hebraica, volume 6 (number 2) (January 1890): pages 109–38.
W.W. Martin. "Genesis XIV. 20; XV. 1." The Old and New Testament Student, volume 11 (number 1 (July 1890): pages 45–47.
"Melchizedek." The Old and New Testament Student, volume 14 (number 2) (February 1892): page 121.

Edwin Cone Bissell. "Is Genesis 21:9–21 a Duplicate of Genesis 16:5–14?" The Biblical World, volume 2 (number 6) (December 1893): pages 407–11.
Hermann Gunkel. "The Two Accounts of Hagar (Genesis xvi. and xxi., 8–21.)." The Monist, volume 10 (number 3) (April 1900): pages 321–42.
Charles Edo Anderson. "Who Was Melchizedek?—A Suggested Emendation of Gen. 14:18." The American Journal of Semitic Languages and Literatures, volume 19 (number 3) (April 1903): pages 176–77.

Yehudah Aryeh Leib Alter. Sefat Emet. Góra Kalwaria (Ger), Poland, before 1906. Excerpted in The Language of Truth: The Torah Commentary of Sefat Emet. Translated and interpreted by Arthur Green, pages 19–25. Philadelphia: Jewish Publication Society, 1998. Reprinted 2012.
Abraham Isaac Kook. The Moral Principles. Early 20th century. In Abraham Isaac Kook: the Lights of Penitence, the Moral Principles, Lights of Holiness, Essays, Letters, and Poems. Translated by Ben Zion Bokser, page 182. Mahwah, New Jersey: Paulist Press 1978.

Hermann Cohen. Religion of Reason: Out of the Sources of Judaism. Translated with an introduction by Simon Kaplan; introductory essays by Leo Strauss, page 301. New York: Ungar, 1972. Reprinted Atlanta: Scholars Press, 1995. Originally published as Religion der Vernunft aus den Quellen des Judentums. Leipzig: Gustav Fock, 1919.
Benno Jacob. The First Book of the Bible: Genesis. Translated by Ernest Jacob and Walter Jacob, pages 85–115. Jersey City, New Jersey: KTAV Publishing House, 1974. Originally published as Das erste Buch der Tora, Genesis: Übersetzt und erklärt von Benno Jacob. Berlin: Schocken Verlag, 1934.
Alexander Alan Steinbach. Sabbath Queen: Fifty-four Bible Talks to the Young Based on Each Portion of the Pentateuch, pages 8–10. New York: Behrman's Jewish Book House, 1936.
Irving Fineman. Jacob, An Autobiographical Novel, pages 11, 17. New York: Random House, 1941.

Thomas Mann. Joseph and His Brothers. Translated by John E. Woods, pages 4–11, 36, 43, 52–54, 59, 78, 89–91, 93, 95–98, 100–02, 125, 141, 148, 153–54, 177, 256–57, 309–10, 339–55, 385, 425, 492, 523, 555, 593–94, 596, 671, 763, 778–79, 781, 788, 806, 859. New York: Alfred A. Knopf, 2005. Originally published as Joseph und seine Brüder. Stockholm: Bermann-Fischer Verlag, 1943.
Umberto Cassuto. A Commentary on the Book of Genesis: Part Two: From Noah to Abraham. Jerusalem, 1949. Translated by Israel Abrahams, pages 289–369. Jerusalem: The Magnes Press, The Hebrew University, 1964; reprinted 1974.
Zofia Kossak. The Covenant: A Novel of the Life of Abraham the Prophet. New York: Roy, 1951.
Jakob J. Petuchowski. "The Controversial Figure of Melchizedek." Hebrew Union College Annual, volume 28 (1957): pages 127–36.
Loren R. Fisher. "Abraham and His Priest-King." Journal of Biblical Literature, volume 81 (number 3) (1962): pages 264–70.
Martin Kessler. "The 'Shield' of Abraham?" Vetus Testamentum, volume 14 (number 4) (October 1964): pages 494–97..
Walter Orenstein and Hertz Frankel. Torah and Tradition: A Bible Textbook for Jewish Youth: Volume I: Bereishis, pages 25–37. New York: Hebrew Publishing Company, 1964.

Yigael Yadin. "A Note on Melchizedek and Qumran." Israel Exploration Journal, volume 15 (number 3) (1965): pages 152–54.
Michael C. Astour. "Political and Cosmic Symbolism in Genesis 14 and Its Babylonian Sources." In Biblical Motifs: Origins and Transformations. Edited by Alexander Altmann, pages 65–112. Cambridge, Massachusetts: Harvard University, 1966.
John A. Emerton. "Melchizedek and the Gods: Fresh Evidence for the Jewish Background of John X. 34–36." The Journal of Theological Studies (new series), volume 17 (number 2) (October 1966): pages 399–401.
Gerhard von Rad. “Faith Reckoned as Righteousness.” In The Problem of the Hexateuch and Other Essays, pages 125–30. New York: McGraw-Hill Book Company, 1966. LCCN 66-11432.
Ronald E. Clements. Abraham and David: Genesis 15 and Its Meaning for Israelite Tradition. London: SCM Press, 1967.
Joseph A. Fitzmyer. "Further Light on Melchizedek from Qumran Cave 11." Journal of Biblical Literature, volume 86 (number 1) (March 1967): pages 25–41.
Harold H. Rowley. "Melchizedek and David." Vetus Testamentum, volume 17 (number 4) (October 1967): page 485.
Delmore Schwartz. "Abraham" and "Sarah." In Selected Poems: Summer Knowledge, pages 230–32. New York: New Directions, 1967.
Erich Auerbach. "Odysseus' Scar." In Mimesis: The Representation of Reality in Western Literature, pages 3–23. Princeton: Princeton University Press, 1968. (comparing accounts of Odysseus and Abraham).

Martin Buber. On the Bible: Eighteen studies, pages 22–43. New York: Schocken Books, 1968.
Jacob Weingreen. " in Genesis 15:7." In Words and Meanings: Essays Presented to David Winton Thomas. Edited by Peter R. Ackroyd and Barnabas Lindars, pages 209–15. Cambridge: Cambridge University Press, 1968.
Stanley Gevirtz. "Abram's 318." Israel Exploration Journal, volume 19 (number 2) (1968): pages 110–13.
Merril P. Miller. "The Function of Isa 61:1–2 in 11Q Melchizedek." Journal of Biblical Literature, volume 88 (number 4) (December 1969): pages 467–69.
R. David Freedman. "A New Approach to the Nuzi Sistership Contract." Journal of the Ancient Near Eastern Society, volume 2 (number 2) (1970): pages 77–85.
Harold L. Ginsberg. "Abram's 'Damascene' Steward." Bulletin of the American Schools of Oriental Research, volume 200 (December 1970): pages 31–32..
John A. Emerton. "Some False Clues in the Study of Genesis XIV." Vetus Testamentum, volume 21 (number 1) (1971): pages 24–27.
John A. Emerton. "The Riddle of Genesis XIV." Vetus Testamentum, volume 21 (number 4) (October 1971): ppages 403–39.
John G. Gammie. "Loci of Melchizedek Tradition of Genesis 14:18–20." Journal of Biblical Literature, volume 90 (number 4) (December 1971): pages 385–96.
Mario Brelich. The Holy Embrace. Translated by John Shepley. Marlboro, Vermont: Marlboro Press, 1994. Originally published as Il Sacro Amplesso. Milan: Adelphi Edizioni s.p.a., 1972.
Samuel Greengus. "Sisterhood Adoption at Nuzi and the 'Wife-Sister' in Genesis." Hebrew Union College Annual, volume 46 (1975): pages 5–31.
Sean E. McEvenue. "A Comparison of Narrative Styles in the Hagar Stories." Semeia, volume 3 (1975): pages 64–80.
Seän M. Warner. “The Patriarchs and Extra-Biblical Sources.” Journal for the Study of the Old Testament, volume 1, number 2 (June 1976): pages 50–61.
J. Maxwell Miller. “The Patriarchs and Extra-Biblical Sources: a Response.” Journal for the Study of the Old Testament, volume 1, number 2 (June 1976): pages 62–66.
J. Russell Kirkland. "The Incident at Salem: A Reexamination of Gen 14:18–23." Studia Biblica et Theologica, volume 7 (1977): pages 3–23.
John Tracy Luke. “Abraham and the Iron Age: Reflections on the New Patriarchal Studies.” Journal for the Study of the Old Testament, volume 2, number 4 (February 1977): pages 35–47.
Peter C. Craigie. The Problem of War in the Old Testament, page 9. Grand Rapids, Michigan: William B. Eerdmans Publishing Company, 1978.
Isaac M. Kikawada. "The Unity of Genesis 12:1–9." Proceedings of the World Congress of Jewish Studies, volume 1 (division A) (1973): pages 229–35.
Terrence Malick. Days of Heaven. 1978.
Donald J. Wiseman. "They Lived in Tents." In Biblical and Near Eastern Studies: Essays in Honor of William Sanford La Sor. Edited by Gary A. Tuttle, pages 195–200. Grand Rapids: Eerdmans, 1978.
Niels-Erik A. Andreasen. "Genesis 14 in its Near Eastern Context." In Scripture in Context: Essays on the Comparative Method. Edited by Carl D. Evans, William W. Hallo, and John B. White, pages 59–77. Pittsburgh: Pickwick Press, 1980.
Thijs Booij. "Hagar's Words in Genesis XVI 13B." Vetus Testamentum, volume 30 (1980): pages 1–7.
Mitchell J. Dahood. "Nomen-Omen in Gen 16,11." Biblica, volume 61 (number 1) (1980): page 69.
George W. Coats. "The Curse in God's Blessing: Genesis 12:1–4a in the Structure and Theology of the Yahwist." In Die Botschaft und die Boten: Festschrift fur Hans Walter Wolff zum 70. Geburtstag. Edited by Jörg Jeremias and L. Perlitt, pages 31–41. Neukirchen–Vluyn: Neukirchener Verlag, 1981.
Gerhard F. Hasel. "The Meaning of the Animal Rite in Gen. 15." Journal for the Study of the Old Testament, volume 6 (number 19) (1981): pages 61–78.
Paul J. Kobelski. Melchizedek and Melchireša'. Washington, D.C.: The Catholic Biblical Association of America, 1981.
Nehama Leibowitz. Studies in Bereshit (Genesis), pages 109–57. Jerusalem: The World Zionist Organization, 1981. Reprinted as New Studies in the Weekly Parasha. Lambda Publishers, 2010.

Moshé Anbar. "Genesis 15: A Conflation of Two Deuteronomic Narratives." Journal of Biblical Literature, volume 101 (1982): pages 39–55.
Walter Brueggemann. Genesis: Interpretation: A Bible Commentary for Teaching and Preaching, pages 105–62. Atlanta: John Knox Press, 1982.
Harold Fisch. “Ruth and the Structure of Covenant History.” Vetus Testamentum, volume 32, number 4 (October 1982): pages 425–37.
David Flusser. [https://www.jstor.org/stable/1454014 "Kobelski's Melchizedek and Melchireša'."] The Jewish Quarterly Review (new series), volume 73 (number 3) (January 1983): pages 294–96.

Larry R. Helyer. "The Separation of Abram and Lot: Its Significance in the Patriarchal Narratives." Journal for the Study of the Old Testament, volume 8 (number 26) (1983): pages 77–88.
Adin Steinsaltz. Biblical Files, pages 12–29. New York: Basic Books, 1984.
Phyllis Trible. "Hagar: The Desolation of Rejection." In Texts of Terror: Literary-Feminist Readings of Biblical Narratives, pages 9–35. Philadelphia: Fortress Press, 1984.

Margaret Atwood. The Handmaid's Tale. Boston: Houghton Mifflin Co., 1986. (handmaiden plot element).
Bo Johnson. "Who Reckoned Righteousness to Whom?" Svensk exegetisk årsbok, volume 51–52 (1986–1987): pages 108–15.
Pinchas H. Peli. Torah Today: A Renewed Encounter with Scripture, pages 11–14. Washington, D.C.: B'nai B'rith Books, 1987.
Debbie Friedman. L'Chi Lach. In And You Shall Be a Blessing ... New York: Sounds Write Productions, 1989.
Marc Gellman. "Finding the Right Man." In Does God Have a Big Toe? Stories About Stories in the Bible, pages 47–51. New York: HarperCollins, 1989.
Nahum M. Sarna. The JPS Torah Commentary: Genesis: The Traditional Hebrew Text with the New JPS Translation, pages 88–128, 377–87. Philadelphia: Jewish Publication Society, 1989.Berit Mila in the Reform Context. Edited by Lewis M. Barth. Berit Mila Board of Reform Judaism, 1990.
Mark E. Biddle. "The 'Endangered Ancestress' and Blessing for the Nations." Journal of Biblical Literature, volume 109 (number 4) (Winter 1990): pages 599–611.
Mark S. Smith. The Early History of God: Yahweh and the Other Deities in Ancient Israel, pages 11, 21, 23, 101. New York: HarperSanFrancisco, 1990.
Aaron Wildavsky. Assimilation versus Separation: Joseph the Administrator and the Politics of Religion in Biblical Israel, pages 5–6, 15, 17–29. New Brunswick, N.J.: Transaction Publishers, 1993.
Joseph B. Soloveitchik. Abraham's Journey. KTAV Publishing House, 2008. (written before 1994).
Judith S. Antonelli. "Sarah: First Jewess." In In the Image of God: A Feminist Commentary on the Torah, pages 27–38. Northvale, New Jersey: Jason Aronson, 1995.
Jacob Milgrom. "Bible Versus Babel: Why did God tell Abraham to leave Mesopotamia, the most advanced civilization of its time, for the backwater region of Canaan?" Bible Review, volume 11 (number 2) (April 1995).
Naomi H. Rosenblatt and Joshua Horwitz. Wrestling With Angels: What Genesis Teaches Us About Our Spiritual Identity, Sexuality, and Personal Relationships, pages 93–157. Delacorte Press, 1995.
Avivah Gottlieb Zornberg. The Beginning of Desire: Reflections on Genesis, pages 72–96. New York: Image Books/Doubleday, 1995.
Karen Armstrong. In the Beginning: A New Interpretation of Genesis, pages 53–62. New York: Knopf, 1996.
Ellen Frankel. The Five Books of Miriam: A Woman's Commentary on the Torah, pages 15–21. New York: G. P. Putnam's Sons, 1996.
Lawrence A. Hoffman. Covenant of Blood: Circumcision and Gender in Rabbinic Judaism. Chicago: University of Chicago Press, 1996.
W. Gunther Plaut. The Haftarah Commentary, pages 23–32. New York: UAHC Press, 1996.
Walter Wangerin, Jr. The Book of God, pages 13–25. Grand Rapids, Michigan: Zondervan, 1996.
Sorel Goldberg Loeb and Barbara Binder Kadden. Teaching Torah: A Treasury of Insights and Activities, pages 19–24. Denver: A.R.E. Publishing, 1997.
Thomas B. Dozeman. "The Wilderness and Salvation History in the Hagar Story." Journal of Biblical Literature, volume 117 (number 1) (Spring 1998): pages 23–43.
Susan Freeman. Teaching Jewish Virtues: Sacred Sources and Arts Activities, pages 4–6. Springfield, New Jersey: A.R.E. Publishing, 1999..

Orson Scott Card. Sarah: Women of Genesis. Salt Lake City: Shadow Mountain, 2000.
David A. deSilva. "Why Did God Choose Abraham?" Bible Review, volume 16 (number 3) (June 2000): pages 16–21, 42–44.
Joseph A. Fitzmyer. "Melchizedek in the MT, LXX, and the NT." Biblica, volume 81 (number 1) (2000): pages 63–69.
Tamara Goshen-Gottstein. “The Souls that They Made: Physical Infertility and Spiritual Fecundity.” In Torah of the Mothers: Contemporary Jewish Women Read Classical Jewish Texts. Edited by Ora Wiskind Elper and Susan Handelman, pages 123–54. New York and Jerusalem: Urim Publications, 2000..
Judy Klitsner. “From the Earth's Hollow Space to the Stars: Two Patriarchs and Their Non-Israelite Mentors.” In Torah of the Mothers: Contemporary Jewish Women Read Classical Jewish Texts. Edited by Ora Wiskind Elper and Susan Handelman, pages 262–88. New York and Jerusalem: Urim Publications, 2000. (comparison of Abraham and Melchizedek, Moses and Jethro).
John S. Kselman. "Genesis." In The HarperCollins Bible Commentary. Edited by James L. Mays, pages 91–94. New York: HarperCollins Publishers, revised edition, 2000.
Martin McNamara. "Melchizedek: Gen 14,17–20 in the Targums, in Rabbinic and Early Christian Literature." Biblica, volume 81 (number 1) (2000): pages 1–31.
Deborah W. Rooke. "Jesus as Royal Priest: Reflections on the Interpretation of the Melchizedek Tradition in Heb 7." Biblica, volume 81 (number 1) (2000): pages 81–94.

Michal Shekel. "What's in a Name?" In The Women's Torah Commentary: New Insights from Women Rabbis on the 54 Weekly Torah Portions. Edited by Elyse Goldstein, pages 57–62. Woodstock, Vermont: Jewish Lights Publishing, 2000.
Robert Bly. "The Night Abraham Called to the Stars." In The Night Abraham Called to the Stars: Poems, page 1. New York: HarperCollins/Perennial, 2001.

Israel Finkelstein and Neil Asher Silberman. "Searching for the Patriarchs." In The Bible Unearthed: Archaeology's New Vision of Ancient Israel and the Origin of Its Sacred Texts, pages 27–47. New York: The Free Press, 2001.
Scott Nikaido. "Hagar and Ishmael as Literary Figures: An Intertextual Study." Vetus Testamentum, volume 51 (number 2) (April 2001): pages 219–42.
Tad Szulc. "Abraham: Journey of Faith." National Geographic, volume 200 (number 6) (December 2001): pages 90–129.
Lainie Blum Cogan and Judy Weiss. Teaching Haftarah: Background, Insights, and Strategies, pages 263–74. Denver: A.R.E. Publishing, 2002.
Michael Fishbane. The JPS Bible Commentary: Haftarot, pages 18–23. Philadelphia: Jewish Publication Society, 2002.
Tikva Frymer-Kensky. "The Disposable Wife" and "Hagar, My Other, My Self." In Reading the Women of the Bible, pages 93–98, 225–37. New York: Schocken Books, 2002.
Keith N. Grüneberg. Abraham, Blessing and the Nations: A Philological and Exegetical Study of Genesis 12:3 in Its Narrative Context. Berlin: De Gruyter, 2003.
Alan Lew. This Is Real and You Are Completely Unprepared: The Days of Awe as a Journey of Transformation, page 20. Boston: Little, Brown and Co., 2003.
Robert Alter. The Five Books of Moses: A Translation with Commentary, pages 62–84. New York: W.W. Norton & Co., 2004.
David M. Carr. "Book Reviews: Abraham, Blessing and the Nations: A Philological and Exegetical Study of Genesis 12:3 in Its Narrative Context by Keith N. Grüneberg." Journal of Biblical Literature, volume 123 (number 4) (Winter 2004): pages 741–44.
Marek Halter, Sarah. New York: Crown Publishers, 2004.
Jon D. Levenson. "Genesis." In The Jewish Study Bible. Edited by Adele Berlin and Marc Zvi Brettler, pages 30–39. New York: Oxford University Press, 2004.Professors on the Parashah: Studies on the Weekly Torah Reading Edited by Leib Moscovitz, pages 31–35. Jerusalem: Urim Publications, 2005.
Jules Francis Gomes. The Sanctuary of Bethel and the Configuration of Israelite Identity. De Gruyter, 2006.
Nachman Levine. “Sarah/Sodom: Birth, Destruction, and Synchronic Transaction.” Journal for the Study of the Old Testament, volume 31 (number 2) (December 2006): pages 131–46.
W. Gunther Plaut. The Torah: A Modern Commentary: Revised Edition. Revised edition edited by David E.S. Stern, pages 88–120. New York: Union for Reform Judaism, 2006.
James L. Kugel. How To Read the Bible: A Guide to Scripture, Then and Now, pages 30, 39, 89–106, 119–32, 146, 159, 301, 356, 421, 435, 649. New York: Free Press, 2007.
David Rosenberg. Abraham: The First Historical Biography. New York: Basic Books, 2006.
David Biespiel. Genesis 12. Poetry, volume 190 (number 3) (June 2007): page 201.
Suzanne A. Brody. Lech L'cha. In Dancing in the White Spaces: The Yearly Torah Cycle and More Poems, page 64. Shelbyville, Kentucky: Wasteland Press, 2007.
Terence E. Fretheim. Abraham: Trials of Family and Faith. Columbia, South Carolina: University of South Carolina Press, 2007.
Esther Jungreis. Life Is a Test, pages 28–29, 49, 68, 130, 134, 214–15, 236. Brooklyn: Shaar Press, 2007.
James C. Okoye. “Sarah and Hagar: Genesis 16 and 21.” Journal for the Study of the Old Testament, volume 32 (number 2) (December 2007): pages 163–75.
Andrei Orlov. "The Heir of Righteousness and the King of Righteousness: The Priestly Noachic Polemics in 2 Enoch and the Epistle to the Hebrews." The Journal of Theological Studies (new series), volume 58 (number 1) (April 2007): pages 45–65. (Melchizedek).
Mary Mills. "The Story of Abraham and Models of Human Identity." New Blackfriars, volume 89 (number 1021) (May 2008): pages 280–99.The Torah: A Women's Commentary. Edited by Tamara Cohn Eskenazi and Andrea L. Weiss, pages 59–84. New York: URJ Press, 2008.
Caryn Aviv and Karen Erlichman. "Going to and Becoming Ourselves: Transformation and Covenants in Parashat Lech Lecha (Genesis 12:1–17:27)." In Torah Queeries: Weekly Commentaries on the Hebrew Bible. Edited by Gregg Drinkwater, Joshua Lesser, and David Shneer; foreword by Judith Plaskow, pages 24–28. New York: New York University Press, 2009.
Gard Granerød. "Melchizedek in Hebrews 7." Biblica, volume 90 (number 2) (2009): pages 188–202.
Reuven Hammer. Entering Torah: Prefaces to the Weekly Torah Portion, pages 17–22. New York: Gefen Publishing House, 2009.

Jonathan Sacks. Covenant & Conversation: A Weekly Reading of the Jewish Bible: Genesis: The Book of Beginnings, pages 65–93. New Milford, Connecticut: Maggid Books, 2009.
Carolyn J. Sharp. "Pharaoh and Abimelech as Innocents Ensnared." In Irony and Meaning in the Hebrew Bible, pages 51–54. Bloomington, Indiana: Indiana University Press, 2009.
John H. Walton. "Genesis." In Zondervan Illustrated Bible Backgrounds Commentary. Edited by John H. Walton, volume 1, pages 68–90. Grand Rapids, Michigan: Zondervan, 2009.
Nick Wyatt. “Circumcision and Circumstance: Male Genital Mutilation in Ancient Israel and Ugarit.” Journal for the Study of the Old Testament, volume 33 (number 4) (June 2009): pages 405–31.
Bernard Gosse. “Abraham and David.” Journal for the Study of the Old Testament, volume 34 (number 1) (September 2009): pages 25–31..
Volker Glissmann. “Genesis 14: A Diaspora Novella?” Journal for the Study of the Old Testament, volume 34 (number 1) (September 2009): pages 33–45.
Nathaniel Helfgot. "Unlocking the Riddle of Abraham the Iconoclast: A Study in the Intertextuality of 'Peshat' and 'Derash.'" Tradition: A Journal of Orthodox Jewish Thought, volume 43 (number 3) (fall 2010): pages 9–16.
Ilan Stavans and Mordecai Drache. "The Mission of Abraham 'And I will bless them.'" In With All Thine Heart: Love and the Bible, pages 49–65. New Brunswick, New Jersey: Rutgers University Press, 2010.
Alexander Massey. “‘If male, is he circumcised?’ Covenant, Community, Compassion and Conscience.” (2011; rev. 2019).
Dan Rickett. “Rethinking the Place and Purpose of Genesis 13.” Journal for the Study of the Old Testament, volume 36 (number 1) (September 2011): pages 31–53.
Calum Carmichael. The Book of Numbers: A Critique of Genesis, pages 11, 19, 27, 55. New Haven: Yale University Press, 2012.
William G. Dever. The Lives of Ordinary People in Ancient Israel: When Archaeology and the Bible Intersect, page 188. Grand Rapids, Michigan: William B. Eerdmans Publishing Company, 2012.
Jonathan Haidt. The Righteous Mind: Why Good People Are Divided by Politics and Religion, page 210. New York: Pantheon, 2012. (circumcision as tribal symbolic marking).

Shmuel Herzfeld. "Avraham: An Evangelical Role Model." In Fifty-Four Pick Up: Fifteen-Minute Inspirational Torah Lessons, pages 12–17. Jerusalem: Gefen Publishing House, 2012.
Jon D. Levenson. Inheriting Abraham: The Legacy of the Patriarch in Judaism, Christianity, and Islam. Princeton, New Jersey: Princeton University Press, 2012.
J. SerVaas Williams. Abraham and Sarah. CreateSpace Independent Publishing Platform, 2012.
Scott N. Morschauser. "Campaigning on Less Than a Shoe-String: An Ancient Egyptian Parallel to Abram's 'Oath' in Genesis 14.22–23." Journal for the Study of the Old Testament, volume 38 (number 2) (December 2013): pages 127–44.
Steven J. Pahl. “Thematic Connections in Psalm 110 and Genesis 14: An Intertextual Study.” Thesis, Ambrose University, 2013.
Stephanie Butnick. "Bas Relief Depicts Circumcision in Ancient Egypt: Relic from 2400 BCE believed to be the oldest illustration of the ritual." Tablet Magazine. (June 18, 2014).
Jonathan Sacks. Lessons in Leadership: A Weekly Reading of the Jewish Bible, pages 13–17. New Milford, Connecticut: Maggid Books, 2015.
"The Hittites: Between Tradition and History." Biblical Archaeology Review, volume 42 (number 2) (March/April 2016): pages 28–40, 68.
Jean-Pierre Isbouts. Archaeology of the Bible: The Greatest Discoveries From Genesis to the Roman Era, pages 34–53. Washington, D.C.: National Geographic, 2016.
Jonathan Sacks. Essays on Ethics: A Weekly Reading of the Jewish Bible, pages 15–20. New Milford, Connecticut: Maggid Books, 2016.
Jacob Bacharach. The Doorposts of Your House and on Your Gates. New York: Liveright, 2017. (novel loosely retelling the story of Abraham, Sarah, and Isaac).
Shai Held. The Heart of Torah, Volume 1: Essays on the Weekly Torah Portion: Genesis and Exodus, pages 21–30. Philadelphia: Jewish Publication Society, 2017.
Steven Levy and Sarah Levy. The JPS Rashi Discussion Torah Commentary, pages 9–11. Philadelphia: Jewish Publication Society, 2017.
Pekka Pitkänen. “Ancient Israelite Population Economy: Ger, Toshav, Nakhri and Karat as Settler Colonial Categories.” Journal for the Study of the Old Testament, volume 42, number 2 (December 2017): pages 139–53.
Jeffrey K. Salkin. The JPS B'nai Mitzvah Torah Commentary, pages 12–16. Philadelphia: Jewish Publication Society, 2017.
Alessandro Massa. “The European Convention on Human Rights and Ritual Male Circumcision: Religion, Family, Rights.” (2019).
Pallant Ramsundar. “Biblical Mistranslations to 'Euphrates' and the Impact on the Borders of Israel.” American Journal of Biblical Theology (2019).
Irit Dekel, Bernhard Forchtner, and Ibrahim Efe. “Circumcising the Body: Negotiating Difference and Belonging in Germany.” National Identitie (2019).
Aren M. Wilson-Wright. "Bethel and the Persistence of El: Evidence for the Survival of El as an Independent Deity in the Jacob Cycle and 1 Kings 12:25–30." Journal of Biblical Literature'', volume 138, number 4 (2019): pages 705–20.

External links

Texts
Masoretic text and 1917 JPS translation
Hear the parashah chanted
Hear the parashah read in Hebrew

Commentaries

Academy for Jewish Religion, California
Academy for Jewish Religion, New York
Aish.com
Akhlah: The Jewish Children's Learning Network
Aleph Beta
American Jewish University—Ziegler School of Rabbinic Studies
Anshe Emes Synagogue, Los Angeles 
Ari Goldwag
Ascent of Safed
Bar-Ilan University
Chabad.org
eparsha.com
G-dcast
The Israel Koschitzky Virtual Beit Midrash
Jewish Agency for Israel
Jewish Theological Seminary
Kabbala Online
Mechon Hadar
Miriam Aflalo
MyJewishLearning.com
Ohr Sameach
Orthodox Union
OzTorah, Torah from Australia
Oz Ve Shalom—Netivot Shalom
Pardes from Jerusalem
Parshah Parts
Professor James L. Kugel
Rabbi Dov Linzer
Rabbi Fabian Werbin
Rabbi Jonathan Sacks
RabbiShimon.com
Rabbi Shlomo Riskin
Rabbi Shmuel Herzfeld
Rabbi Stan Levin
Reconstructionist Judaism 
Sephardic Institute
Shiur.com
613.org Jewish Torah Audio
Tanach Study Center
Teach613.org, Torah Education at Cherry Hill
TheTorah.com
Torah from Dixie
Torah.org
TorahVort.com
Union for Reform Judaism
United Synagogue of Conservative Judaism
What's Bothering Rashi?
Yeshivat Chovevei Torah
Yeshiva University

 
Abraham
Weekly Torah readings from Genesis
Weekly Torah readings in Cheshvan